Clara   also released internationally as The Little Dragon   is a 2019 Ukrainian computer-animated fantasy adventure film directed by Oleksandr Klymenko from a screenplay by Klymenko and Serhii Grabar. Produced by Image Pictures, Clara was released in Ukrainian cinemas on 26 October 2019.

Premise 
One day, Clara, who lives in a small house with three monkeys, finds a magical dragon in a forest. After some deliberation, Clara, together with two friends, a cheerful raccoon and a grumpy dwarf, decide to help the little dragon by attempting to find his home. However, unbeknownst to them, the Forces of Evil are hunting not only the Dragon, but now Clara and her friends as well.

Voice cast 
The Ukrainian voice cast:
Veronika Lukyanenko as Clara
Oleksandr Pogrebnyak as Raccoon
Serhiy Solopai as Alfred
Dmytro Zavadskyi as Sip
Matvii Nikolaev as Alchemist
Kyrylo Nikitenko as Panther
Dmytro Vikulov as Mole
Dmytro Gavrilov as innkeeper
Yuriy Soskov as Boy Dwarf
Kateryna Bashkina-Zlenko as Girl Gnome 
Oleg Lepenets as Grandfather Gnome
Vyacheslav Dudko as Blacksmith Gnome 
Demyan Shiyan as Boy
Oleg Lepenets as Butler

Music 
The soundtrack was composed by Ivan Rozyn, Max Smogol, Zakhar Dzyubenko and Nikita Moiseev. Pur:Pur performed songs in both Ukrainian and English, while one of the songs was performed by the Dovzhenko Sound Studio musical orchestra.

References

External links 

Clara at DzygaMDB (in Ukrainian)

2019 animated films
Ukrainian animated films
Ukrainian animated fantasy films
Ukrainian adventure films
Ukrainian-language films